The 1979 NBA All-Star Game was an exhibition basketball game which was played on February 4, 1979, at the Pontiac Silverdome in the Detroit suburb of Pontiac, Michigan.

Coaches: East: Dick Motta, West: Lenny Wilkens.
Officials: John Vanak, Jack Madden, and Hugh Evans
MVP: David Thompson
Attendance: 31,745

This was the first All-Star Game where no Boston Celtics or New York Knicks had been selected as All-Stars.

In addition, this was the first All-Star game held in a football or baseball dome as opposed to a traditional basketball arena (the Detroit Pistons were playing in this venue at the time).

Team rosters

Western Conference

Eastern Conference

Score by periods

References 

National Basketball Association All-Star Game
All-Star